Owen O'Neill is a Northern Irish writer, actor, director, and comedian.

Early life
O'Neill was born, the third eldest of 16 children, in Cookstown, Northern Ireland. He has drawn on his upbringing in Cookstown for some of his more colourful characters in his standup and theatre work. Early comic influences included W. C. Fields, Laurel and Hardy, and particularly Richard Pryor: "It was also poignant and heartfelt and I realised then that stand-up could be an art-form".  He briefly attended Queen’s University in Belfast studying English, but dropped out and worked various menial jobs in Italy, Amsterdam, and finally London at age 21.

Career
O'Neill cites his career as beginning in poetry. In 1981 he entered and won a poetry competition for BBC Radio 4 and his stand-up evolved out of his poetry readings. He debuted on television in 1985 on Saturday Live. As an actor, he has appeared in the films Michael Collins and The General.
 
O'Neill is a veteran of the Edinburgh Fringe Festivals, having performed stand-up or theatre gigs there for over twenty years. He was nominated for the 1994 Perrier Award with his show "It's a Bit Like This", and won a Fringe First in 1999 with Sean Hughes for the theatre show "Dehydrated and Travellin' Light". Theatre sets have included 12 Angry Men, One Flew Over The Cuckoo's Nest and The Odd Couple. Stand-up has included "Off My Face" and "It Was Henry Fonda's Fault".

As a writer, his debut feature film Arise and Go Now was screened by BBC2 and was directed by Danny Boyle and starred Ian Bannen.  He has adapted a number of his works of short fictions to be plays or films.

His short film The Basket Case won the best Irish short at the 2008 Boston Irish Film Festival, where judges described it as "a beautiful and memorable film",  and best International short at The 2010 Fantaspoa film festival in Brazil.

O'Neill's play Absolution performed on Off Broadway in 2010 to good reviews. Charles Isherwood of The New York Times praised the effective writing and O'Neill's performance as "hold[ing] the attention fast with its understated, almost offhand intensity.". He won best actor at the Irish Theatre Festival Awards for the role.

Awards and honours

Filmography

Film
 Michael Collins (Rory O’Connor) (1998)
 "Arise and Go Now" (writer) (1991)
 The Basket Case (writer) (2008)

Television
 Shooting to Stardom (writer) (1993) 
 The Bill (George Rayburn) (2000)
 The Fitz (writer) (2000)
 DNA (writer) (2000)
 Saints and Scholars (presenter) 2000-02

Theatre
 Much Ado About Nothing (Dogberry) (1998)
 Off My Face (1998)
 12 Angry Men (2003)
 One flew over the Cuckoo’s Nest (Dale Harding) (2006)
 The Odd Couple (Roy)(2005)
 The Shawshank Redemption (2009)
 Absolution (Nathan, also playwright)(2010)

Bibliography
 WB Yeats and Me (short story)
 The Basket Case (short story)
 Volcano Dancing (2006)

References

External links

Male comedians from Northern Ireland
Male film actors from Northern Ireland
Living people
Year of birth missing (living people)
Stand-up comedians from Northern Ireland
Satirists from Northern Ireland
Comedy writers from Northern Ireland
Humorists from Northern Ireland